Popielina-Towarzystwo  is a village in the administrative district of Gmina Lututów, within Wieruszów County, Łódź Voivodeship, in central Poland.

References

Popielina-Towarzystwo